Stephanie of Milly may refer to:
Stephanie of Milly, Lady of Oultrejordain (born c.1145/1155- c.1197)
Stephanie of Milly, Lady of Gibelet (died c.1197)